Parholaspis is a genus of mites in the family Parholaspididae. There are at least four described species in Parholaspis.

Species
These four species belong to the genus Parholaspis:
 Parholaspis caelebs Vitzthum, 1926
 Parholaspis kewensis Evans, 1956
 Parholaspis meridionalis Ishikawa, 1980
 Parholaspis squameus Tseng, 1993

References

Parholaspididae
Articles created by Qbugbot